Vanja Smiljanic (born 27 January 1990) is an Australian team handball player. She plays for the club Melbourne HC, and on both Australian national team (indoor) and is the captain of the Australia women's national beach handball team (beach handball).

Indoor handball career 
She was part of the New South Wales state team for the Australian championships and contributed to earning gold medals in 2005, 2006 and 2008

She changed clubs and joined the Melbourne Handball Club in 2012. She was then part of the Victorian state team for the Australian championships and contributed to gold medal performances in 2012 and 2015.

Beach handball career 
Current captain of the Australian national team, she was part of the Victorian state team that won the bronze medal in the Australian Beach Handball Championships in 2015.

She was part of one of New South Wales team that won the Australian Championship silver medal in 2010 and gold medal in 2011.

Achievements
2014: MVP and best scorer in the Australian Beach Handball Championships
2016: Australian Beach Handball Championships - All Star Team (Best Left Wing player)

International indoor handball career 
She represented Australia at the 2013 World Women's Handball Championship in Serbia.

International beach handball career 
She is the captain of the Australian team that secured an 8th position at the World Championships in Hungary, July 2016.

She also represented Australia for the following events:
 2014 Beach Handball World Championships - Brazil
 2013 World Games (Beach Handball) - Colombia
 2012 Beach Handball world championships - Oman

References

Australian female handball players
1990 births
Living people